Oar is the only solo studio album by American rock musician Skip Spence, released on May 19, 1969 by Columbia Records. It was recorded over seven days in December 1968 in Nashville, and features Spence on all of the instruments.

History
Described as "one of the most harrowing documents of pain and confusion ever made", the album was recorded after Spence had spent six months in Bellevue Hospital. Spence had been committed to Bellevue following a delusion-driven attempt to attack Moby Grape bandmates Don Stevenson and Jerry Miller with a fire axe.

At the time of Spence's release from hospital, he had written a number of songs that he wanted to record. Producer David Rubinson suggested that Spence record at the Columbia studios in Nashville, where there was a particularly patient recording engineer, Mike Figlio. Rubinson instructed Figlio to keep the tapes running at all times, to record everything that Spence did. The majority of the tracks were recorded using a three-track recorder. Rubinson chose to stay away from the studio, concerned that Spence's recording activities would be distracted by the presence of a producer.

According to Spence, the Nashville sessions were intended by him to only be a demo, which he gave to Rubinson with the intent that the songs would be fleshed out with full production for the actual album. Instead, Rubinson had the demo recordings released by Columbia.

When first released, Oar was not promoted by Columbia Records, despite pleadings from Rubinson. It was at the time the lowest-selling album in Columbia Records history and was deleted from the Columbia catalogue within a year of its release.

As described by critic Ross Bennett:

The album is viewed by critic Lindsay Planer as follows:

The album is viewed by critic John Reed in the Boston Globe:

Subsequent reissues have added ten more songs, in different stages of completion, to the original dozen. The original release ended with a fade out of "Grey / Afro". The 1999 Sony/Sundazed reissue appends "This Time He Has Come" to a fade-less "Grey / Afro", which reflects how the two songs appeared on the master tapes.

The first CD reissue of Oar was released by Sony Special Products in 1991 and was totally remixed from the multitrack masters.  This was the first release of the fadeless "Grey / Afro" along with 4 outtakes from the sessions.  This CD edition is no longer in print and is highly sought after by fans. The newer Sundazed reissue uses the original 1968 mix master tapes for the first time and added a further 6 unreleased tracks.

In 1999, the Birdman label of Burbank, California released a tribute album titled More Oar: A Tribute To The Skip Spence Album. It featured covers of the original record's tracks by Robert Plant, Robyn Hitchcock, Tom Waits, Greg Dulli, Mark Lanegan, Beck, Diesel Park West, Mudhoney, and others.

It was voted number 510 in the third edition of Colin Larkin's All Time Top 1000 Albums (2000).
In November 2009, as part of his "Record Club" series, Beck began posting the videos of his complete version of Oar on his website (www.beck.com), recorded with members of Wilco, Feist, Jamie Lidell, James Gadson, Brian LeBarton, and others the previous June.

In 2013, the album was listed at number 8 on Ballast's list of top 50 Canadian albums of all time.  The album was also included in the book 1001 Albums You Must Hear Before You Die. In 1998, The Wire included Oar in their list of "100 Records That Set the World on Fire (While No One Was Listening)". The staff described the "brilliant" album as "a progenitor of both the loner/stoner and lo-fi movements", further writing that: "Recorded on three track(!), absolutely solo, Oar represents a type of internalized psychedelic exploration that would not find a real audience for decades."

Track listing
All tracks composed by Alexander "Skip" Spence
 "Little Hands"  – 3:44
 "Cripple Creek"  – 2:16
 "Diana"  – 3:32
 "Margaret/Tiger Rug"  – 2:17
 "Weighted Down (The Prison Song)"  – 6:27
 "War in Peace"  – 4:05
 "Broken Heart"  – 3:29
 "All Come to Meet Her"  – 2:04
 "Books of Moses"  – 2:42
 "Dixie Peach Promenade (Yin for Yang)"  – 2:53
 "Lawrence of Euphoria"  – 1:31
 "Grey/Afro"  – 9:38
Extra Oar (1999 CD reissue bonus tracks)
 "This Time He Has Come"  – 4:42
 "It's the Best Thing for You"  – 2:48
 "Keep Everything Under Your Hat"  – 3:06
 "Furry Heroine (Halo of Gold)"  – 3:35
 "Givin' up Things"  – 0:59
Unissued Oar
 "If I'm Good"  – 0:47
 "You Know"  – 1:47
 "Doodle"  – 1:02
 "Fountain"  – 0:34
 "I Think You and I"  – 1:14

Personnel
Alexander "Skip" Spence - vocals, acoustic guitar, electric guitar, bass guitar, drums

Technical
Charlie Bradley, Don Meehan, Mike Figlio - engineer
David Rubinson, Don Meehan - mixing

References

1969 debut albums
Columbia Records albums
Sundazed Records albums
Skip Spence albums
Psychedelic rock albums by Canadian artists
Lo-fi music albums